Charles Lemert (born 1937) is an American born social theorist and sociologist. He has written extensively on social theory, globalization and culture. He has contributed to many key debates in social thought, authoring dozens of books including his best-selling text Social Things: An Introduction to the Sociological Life, 5th edition (Rowman & Littlefield, 2011), which the historian Howard Zinn, the author of A People's History of the United States, has called "one of those rare ruminations on the human condition that makes you want to return to it after your first reading to ponder its ideas." From 1982 to 2010, he taught at Wesleyan University in Middletown, Connecticut. 

He currently lives in New Haven, Connecticut with his family.

Lemert is distinguished as a theorist in the US, most notably for introducing French theory to American sociology. His first book Sociology and the Twilight of Man: Homocentrism and Discourse in Sociological Theory (Southern Illinois University Press, 1979) drew from theoretical contributions of the likes of Michel Foucault and Jacques Derrida in order to critique humanism in sociological theory. His article "Language, Structure, and Measurement: Structuralist Semiotics and Sociology" (1979) published in the American Journal of Sociology and his French Sociology: Rupture and Renewal since 1968 (Columbia University Press, 1981), which brought together scholarly contributions from leading French intellectuals, and Michel Foucault: Social Theory as Transgression (Columbia University Press, 1982) co-authored with Garth Gillan, helped to set in stone his reputation as the leading sociological interpreter of French theory.

Lemert is also known for his best-selling instructional texts: Social Theory: The Multicultural and Classic Readings (Westview Press, 2004)  and Thinking the Unthinkable: The Riddles of Classical Social Theories (Paradigm Publishers, 2007).

Lately, he has written on a wide range of subjects. His most recent works have dealt with globalization and culture. His co-authored work with Anthony Elliott, The New Individualism (Routledge, 2005),  explores the figure of the individual looking at the emotional costs of globalization. His Durkheim's Ghosts (Cambridge University Press, 2006) reclaims the legacy of the early sociologist to offer a radical different intellectual trajectory than those who have recently taken ownership of Émile Durkheim, namely the strong program of cultural sociology espoused by sociologist Jeffrey C. Alexander. In addition to co-editing a reader with Elliott, and former students, Daniel Chaffee, and Eric L. Hsu, on Globalization for Routledge, he has recently published a major work on Protestant theologian Reinhold Niebuhr for Yale University Press.

In 2014, a two-day international workshop was held at the Hawke Research Institute at the University of South Australia to celebrate and assess Lemert and Elliott's work on the New Individualism, 2nd edition (Routledge, 2009), nearly a decade after its publication. Workshop participants hailed from countries such as Japan, the United States, Australia and Ireland.

He maintains a column called Slow Thoughts for Fast Times for the online journal Fast Capitalism and edits the Great Barrington Books series for Paradigm Publishers and New Social Formations series for Rowman & Littlefield.

Career 
Education

Lemert received his PhD from Harvard University in 1972 after completing work at Andover Newton Theological School and Miami University in Ohio. While a graduate student in the Harvard Department of Social Relations, Lemert studied with Talcott Parsons and Robert Bellah. His dissertation advisor was the theologian Harvey Cox.  At the time he completed his dissertation he was a fellow of the Center for Urban Studies (a joint center with MIT and Harvard). He also received an honorary doctorate from the University of the West of England in 2004.

Positions

Lemert is John C. Andrus Emeritus Professor of Sociology at Wesleyan University, where he taught from 1982-2010. Currently, he is Senior Fellow of the Center for Comparative Research at Yale University and he teaches at the Boston Graduate School of Psychoanalysis.

In 2014, he was appointed the inaugural Vice Chancellor's Professorial Fellow at the University of South Australia, where he contributes to the Hawke Research Institute. He has delivered numerous public lectures and masterclasses at the Hawke Research Institute, University of South Australia's flagship research institute in the social sciences, humanities and creative arts. Some of his lectures have appeared on programs broadcast by the Australian Broadcasting Corporation (ABC).

Previously, he was Professor of Sociology at Southern Illinois University at Carbondale from 1977-1981. He has also held several visiting scholarships at various institutions, including Centre de Sociologie Européenne: Education et Culture, Maison des Sciences de l'Homme, Centre d'Etudes Sociologiques, Trinity College (Connecticut), Columbia University, and MIT. He is a member of the Connecticut Academy of Arts and Sciences.

He is currently Pastoral Associate for the Homeless, Trinity Church on the Green, an Associate in Community Relations and Board Member, at Neighborhood Housing Services of New Haven, a Vice-Chancellor's Professorial Fellow at The Hawke Institute, University of South Australia, Adelaide, and Senior Research Scholar, Sociology, Yale University.

Recent works 

Introduction to Contemporary Social Theory, with Anthony Elliott (Routledge, 2014)
Uncertain Worlds: World-Systems Analysis in Changing Times, with Immanuel Wallerstein and Carlos Aguirre Rojas, (Paradigm, 2013)
The Structural Lie: Small Clues to Global Things (Paradigm, 2011)
Why Niebuhr Matters (Yale University Press, 2011)
Globalization: A Reader, with Anthony Elliott, Daniel Chaffee, Eric L. Hsu (Routledge, 2010)
Thinking the Unthinkable: The Riddles of Classical Social Theories (Paradigm Publishers, 2007) 
Durkheim’s Ghosts: Cultural Logics and Social Things (Cambridge University Press, 2006)
The Souls of W.E.B. Du Bois, with Alford A. Young, Jr., Jerry G. Watts, Manning Marable & Elizabeth Higginbotham (Boulder & London: Paradigm Publishers, 2006)
Deadly Worlds: The Emotional Costs of Globalization, with Anthony Elliott (Rowman & Littlefield NA, 2006; world rights: Routledge, UK, 2005 as The New Individualism)
Social Things (Rowman & Littlefield, 2005; 3e revised & enlarged; 2005). 2e 2001; 1e 1997. German and Danish editions, 2004
Postmodernism Is Not What You Think (Paradigm Publishers, 2005; 2e revised & enlarged; forthcoming) Original publisher: Blackwell, 1997.  Portuguese/Brazilian Edition, 2001; with a new preface
Sociology After the Crisis (Paradigm Publishers, 2004; 2e revised & enlarged). Original publisher: Perseus Books, 1995-2002
Globalization: An Introduction to the End of the Known World (Routledge/Paradigm, 2015)
Americans Thinking: An Introduction to American Social Theory (Routledge/Paradigm, 2018)
 Silence and Society (Routledge/Paradigm, 2018)
 Uncertain Futures: Theories of Capitalism, with Kristin Plys (Routledge/Paradigm, 2018).

References

External links 
Faculty Page at University of South Australia
Video of Lecture entitled "Future of the World" delivered at Flinders University of South Australia, March 14, 2007.

1937 births
American sociologists
Columbia University staff
Harvard University alumni
Southern Illinois University faculty
Wesleyan University faculty
Miami University alumni
Living people